Silesian Theatre dedicated to Stanisław Wyspiański is the largest theatre in Silesia. It is located on the market square in Katowice.

It was built as "German Theatre" in the years 1905–1907, from plans by German theatre architect Carl Moritz. In the interwar Poland from 1922 to 1939 it was known as the "Polish Theatre".

References

External links

 Homepage

Theatres completed in 1907
Buildings and structures in Katowice
Theatres in Katowice
Tourist attractions in Silesian Voivodeship
1907 establishments in Germany